Amata tritonia is a moth of the subfamily Arctiinae. It was described by George Hampson in 1911. It is found in Nigeria.

References

 

Endemic fauna of Nigeria
tritonia
Moths described in 1911
Moths of Africa